Plaridel Abaya (born Plaridel Madarang Abaya on February 25, 1934) is a Filipino politician who served as the representative of Cavite's 1st congressional district from 1995 to 2004. He ran for congressman representing second district of Cavite in the 2010 elections but lost.

Personal life 
He was married to Consuelo Aguinaldo-Abaya, the granddaughter of former Philippine President Emilio Aguinaldo and the daughter of Emilio del Rosario Aguinaldo Jr. and they have 6 children including Francis Gerald and Joseph Emilio. He has a son named Paul Plaridel, who ran for congressman in the 2022 elections but lost to Jolo Revilla, ending the Abaya political dynasty in the Cavite 1st district for 27 years.

References 

Living people
Members of the House of Representatives of the Philippines from Cavite
Politicians from Cavite
Nationalist People's Coalition politicians
Liberal Party (Philippines) politicians
1934 births